La Mercy is a suburb of the eThekwini municipality about  north of Durban, South Africa. It is the location of Durban's King Shaka International Airport. It has four distinct areas - The airport precinct, the main residential area, a shanty town, and a beach-front strip of apartments along South Beach Road.

Although host to an international airport, La Mercy is a small suburb, with no shopping center or public transport to speak of; severely lacking in communal infrastructure such as pavements and public parks.

There is one under-utilised primary school (La Mercy Primary), two hotels (La Mercy Beach Hotel and Seabelle) with restaurants, two shops, and a community hall.

References

Saxhuma IT Saxhuma IT

External links
 La Mercy website
 La Mercy IT Team

Populated places in eThekwini Metropolitan Municipality